Agonum muelleri is a species of ground beetle native to the Palearctic, the Nearctic and the Near East. In Europe, it is found in Albania, the Azores, Baltic states, Belarus, Benelux, Great Britain including the Isle of Man, Northern Ireland, mainland Portugal, Russia, Sardinia, Sicily (doubtful), mainland Spain, Ukraine, Scandinavia, Slovenia, Croatia, Serbia, Montenegro, Bosnia-Herzegovina, and North Macedonia, and Central Europe.

Subspecies
Agonum muelleri muelleri
Agonum muelleri unicolor

References

muelleri
Beetles of Europe
Beetles described in 1784